Ameivula abalosi is a species of teiid lizard found in Argentina and Paraguay.

The unique combination of characteristics, such as the presence of five superciliary scales, a low number of femoral pores, and the presence of erect thorn-like scales along the lower half of the calf in males, distinguishes Ameivula abalosi from the other species in the Ameivula genus.

References

abalosi
Reptiles described in 2012
Lizards of South America
Taxa named by Mario R. Cabrera